The 2016 CAF Champions League qualifying rounds were played from 12 February to 20 April 2016. A total of 55 teams competed in the qualifying rounds to decide the eight places in the group stage of the 2016 CAF Champions League.

Draw

The draw for the preliminary, first and second rounds was held on 11 December 2015 in Dakar, Senegal.

The entry round of the 55 teams entered into the draw was determined by their performances in the CAF competitions for the previous five seasons (CAF 5-Year Ranking points shown in parentheses).

Format

In the qualifying rounds, each tie was played on a home-and-away two-legged basis. If the aggregate score was tied after the second leg, the away goals rule would be applied, and if still tied, extra time would not be played, and the penalty shoot-out would be used to determine the winner (Regulations III. 13 & 14).

Schedule
The schedule of each round was as follows.

Bracket

The eight winners of the second round advanced to the group stage, while the eight losers of the second round entered the Confederation Cup play-off round.

Preliminary round
The preliminary round included the 46 teams that did not receive byes to the first round.

|}

AS Vita Club won 4–0 on aggregate.

Ferroviário Maputo won on walkover after Centre Chiefs withdrew.

Mamelodi Sundowns won 2–1 on aggregate.

Warri Wolves won on walkover after Sporting Praia Cruz failed to arrive for the first leg.

Étoile du Congo won 3–0 on aggregate.

Wydad AC won 3–2 on aggregate.

CNaPS Sport won 3–1 on aggregate.

Saint George won 4–1 on aggregate.

Enyimba won 2–1 on aggregate.

2–2 on aggregate. Vital'O won on away goals.

Olympique Khouribga won 4–2 on aggregate.

Stade Malien won 4–1 on aggregate.

ZESCO United won 3–0 on aggregate.

Horoya won 4–0 on aggregate.

APR won 4–2 on aggregate.

Young Africans won 3–0 on aggregate.

Recreativo do Libolo won 9–1 on aggregate.

Kaizer Chiefs won on walkover after Volcan Club failed to arrive for the second leg.

ASEC Mimosas won 1–0 on aggregate.

Al-Ahli Tripoli won 2–1 on aggregate.

Union Douala won 4–1 on aggregate.

Club Africain won 2–0 on aggregate.

MO Béjaïa won 3–2 on aggregate.

First round
The first round included 32 teams: the 23 winners of the preliminary round, and the 9 teams that received byes to this round.

|}

AS Vita Club won 2–1 on aggregate.

Mamelodi Sundowns won 3–1 on aggregate.

Al-Merrikh won 2–0 on aggregate.

ES Sétif won 5–3 on aggregate.

Wydad AC won 6–3 on aggregate.

TP Mazembe won 3–2 on aggregate.

Enyimba won 6–3 on aggregate.

Étoile du Sahel won 3–1 on aggregate.

Stade Malien won 2–1 on aggregate.

ZESCO United won 4–3 on aggregate.

Young Africans won 3–2 on aggregate.

Al-Ahly won 2–0 on aggregate.

ASEC Mimosas won 1–0 on aggregate.

2–2 on aggregate. Al-Ahli Tripoli won on away goals

Zamalek won 3–0 on aggregate.

MO Béjaïa won 2–1 on aggregate.

Second round
The second round included the 16 winners of the first round.

|}

2–2 on aggregate. AS Vita Club won on away goals.The CAF announced on 24 May 2016 that Mamelodi Sundowns won on walkover after AS Vita Club were disqualified for fielding an ineligible player in their preliminary round tie against Mafunzo. Mamelodi Sundowns played in the Confederation Cup play-off round before they were reinstated to the Champions League.

2–2 on aggregate. ES Sétif won on away goals.

Wydad AC won 3–1 on aggregate.

3–3 on aggregate. Enyimba won 4–3 on penalties.

ZESCO United won 5–2 on aggregate.

Al-Ahly won 3–2 on aggregate.

ASEC Mimosas won 3–2 on aggregate.

Zamalek won 3–1 on aggregate.

Notes

References

External links
Orange CAF Champions League 2016, CAFonline.com

1